James Blake and Mardy Fish were the defending champions, but lost in the first round this year.

Mark Knowles and Daniel Nestor won in the final 6–3, 6–4 against Martín García and Luis Horna.

Seeds

Draw

Draw

External links
Draw

Doubles